Red Flag Lake, also known as Red Flag Reservoir, is an artificial lake in Zhenning Buyei and Miao Autonomous County, Guizhou, China. The lake discharges into the Zhenning River.

Function
The lake provides drinking water and water for irrigation.

Dam

Picture

References

 

Lakes of Guizhou
Zhenning Buyei and Miao Autonomous County